Benjamin Ross Evans (born 31 July 1975) is a former international Wales rugby union player. A prop, he has played for Ospreys, Cardiff Blues and Calvisano. He has played for Jersey and Moseley RFC. After spending time playing amateur rugby for Waverley Rugby Club in Sydney, Australia, Ben is now the Scrummaging and set piece coach at the Parramatta Two Blues

References

External links
Sale profile
Parramatta Two Blues

1975 births
Living people
Cardiff RFC players
Cardiff Rugby players
Jersey Reds players
Moseley Rugby Football Club players
Rugby union players from Cardiff
Rugby union props
Swansea RFC players
Wales international rugby union players
Welsh rugby union players